Buol, Indonesia, may refer to:
Buol Island
Buol (town)
Buol (village)
Buol Regency